Perhat Khaliq (born July 24, 1982), also known as Perhat, is a Chinese pop-rock composer and musician best known for his performances on the Chinese reality talent show The Voice of China in 2014.

Personal life
Perhat Khaliq grew up in an industrial area in Ürümqi, Xinjiang Uyghur Autonomous Region.

Career
In 2006, Perhat founded his current band Qetiq with his wife (Pazilet Tursun, a singer), cousin and some friends. He earned a living performing with his band in pubs in Ürümqi. In 2014, his participation in the reality show The Voice of China attracted much public attention.

The band released their first Uyghur language album Qetiq: Rock from Taklamakan Desert recorded during their trip to Europe in Morgenland Festival Osnabrück, 2010.

A documentary film was made, "Qetiq, Rock'n Urumchi" by Mukaddas Mijit (55' 2013) about their first historical concert in Morgenland Festival Osnabrück

In 2015, he and his band Qetiq embarked on their first China tour performing in 22 major cities in 40 days. In May 2015, he received the prestigious Dutch's Prince Claus Awards for "breathing new life into traditional Uyghur forms".

At the 2015 Prince Claus Awards, Ong Keng Sen (one of the judges and who is director of Singapore International Festival of Arts (SIFA)), was very impressed with his performances and invited Perhat to perform in Singapore. He and his band gave a stellar performance at the 2016 SIFA pre-festival O.P.E.N. (Open. Participate. Engage. Negotiate.) on June 23, 2016, which is also their Asian premiere outside of China.

Discography

See also
Ablajan Awut Ayup
Arken Abdulla

References

External links
Qetiq, Rock'n Urumchi
Qetiq, Rock From Taklamakan Desert 

1982 births
Living people
Musicians from Xinjiang
Chinese rock musicians
Chinese male singer-songwriters
The Voice of China contestants
Uyghur people
People from Ürümqi